Bromobenzyl cyanide (BBC) is an obsolete lachrymatory agent introduced in World War I by the Allied Powers. When implemented in World War I, it revolutionized the use of tear agents due to their extreme potency. BBC is toxic like chlorine gas.

See also
Chloroacetophenone
CR gas
CS gas
Lachrymatory agent

References

External links
 
 

Benzene derivatives
Lachrymatory agents
Nitriles
Organobromides